The 2016 Oldham Metropolitan Borough Council election took place on 5 May 2016 to elect members of Oldham Metropolitan Borough Council in England. This was on the same day as other local elections.

After the election, the composition of the council was

Labour 46
Liberal Democrat 9
Conservative 2
UKIP 1
Independent 2

Election result

Ward results 
The electoral division results are as follows:

Alexandra ward

Chadderton Central ward

Chadderton North ward

Chadderton South ward

Coldhurst ward

Crompton ward

Failsworth East ward

Failsworth West ward

Hollinwood ward

Medlock Vale ward

Royton North ward

Royton South ward

Saddleworth North ward

Saddleworth South ward

Saddleworth West & Lees ward

Shaw ward

St. James ward

St. Mary's ward

Waterhead ward

Werneth ward

References

2016 English local elections
2016
2010s in Greater Manchester